Grove Green is a suburban housing development, partially forming a part of Weavering village, near the town of Maidstone in Kent, England. The population of the development is included in the civil parish of Boxley.  The estate is also near the village of Bearsted and is convenient for the M20 motorway making its homes keenly sought after by London commuters. For young people, there is a youth group, and Grove Green Scout Group.

The name 'Grove Green' can be traced back to at least the early 20th century, as seen in ordnance survey maps of the time. This is due to the way the area was previously divided up. The area now covered in housing once formed part of a vast country estate, the remains of the manor house can be found at the nearby Vinters Valley Nature reserve. Grove Green was built upon the market farm, in the Eastern part of the estate. Similarly, nearby Vinters Park housing estate was built upon the former hop and wheat fields to the west. A remaining  of former estate land is maintained by the Vinters Valley Nature Reserve.

The Maidstone Studios are also nearby which has resulted in the area being used for many television programs including Cats Eyes, Tittybangbang, What's Up Doc and others.

The development includes a primary school, supermarket, community centre, doctors surgery and other small shops, as well as two pubs. The Minor Centre shopping area is within Grove Green.

In 2006, Abbey New Homes plc submitted a planning application for five new dwellings to be built upon the land between Grovewood Drive (North) and Grovewood Drive (South). The council rejected this, resulting in a metal 'prison fence' being erected around the land owned by the developer. The reasoning for the rejection of the application was said by the council to be wanting an option to be able to open up the road, and join the two ends of Grovewood drive, to ease the growing traffic problems of the development. In 2007, the application was re-submitted, with minor modifications. The council reluctantly gave permission for the development to go ahead. Construction started in mid-2007, and was completed in April 2008.

The community hall is for a number of local social events including shin-gi-tai karate club who took over the original Grove Green Karate Club in 2003. This club has been operating in Grove green for well over 20 years and still enjoys the support of many local students.

External links

Villages in Kent